Platycorynus descarpentriesi is a species of leaf beetle of the Democratic Republic of the Congo. It was described by Brian J. Selman in 1970.

References

Eumolpinae
Beetles of the Democratic Republic of the Congo
Beetles described in 1970
Endemic fauna of the Democratic Republic of the Congo